Carl Friedrich Schmidt may refer to:

 Carl Friedrich Schmidt (artist) (1811–1890), German botanical artist and lithographer
 Carl Friedrich Schmidt (geologist) (1832–1908), Baltic German geologist and botanist

See also
 Carl Friedrich Schmid (1840–1897), Baltic German chess player